Ivar Christian Hallström, born Stockholm, 5 June 1826, died in that city on 11 April 1901 was a Swedish composer, particularly of opera.

Life
Although he learnt the piano, Hallström was self-taught as a composer. He studied law in Uppsala and in 1853 was appointed librarian to Prince Oscar which assisted him in advancing his career as a composer. His operas in collaboration with the librettist Frans Hedberg launched his operatic career, where he was particularly able to use Swedish folk tunes effectively. Hallström introduced a flavour of Gallic wit into his light operas, many of them based on French libretti. Fourteen operatic works survive.

He was one of the founding members of Sällskapet Idun, a men's association founded in Stockholm in 1862.

After many years neglect, Hallström’s operas were revived, in Umeå in 1986 with Bergtagna, seen also at the York Early Music Festival in 1988, Hertig Magnus at Vadstena in 1988 and 2000, also broadcast on Swedish television, and Liten Karin in 1997, also at Vadstena, with Malena Ernman as Princess Cecilia.

Compositions
Hertig Magnus och sjöjungfrun (Duke Magnus and the mermaid) – romantic operetta
Mjölnarvargen (after Le diable au moulin by Eugène Cormon and Michel Carré) - operetta
Den bergtagna (The bride of the mountain king) – romantic opera
Vikingarne (The Vikings) – romantic opera
Neaga - opera
Per Svinaherde (Peter the swineherd) – fairy play
Ett äfventyr i Skottland (An Adventure in Scotland) - ballet in two acts
En dröm (A dream) - ballet in one act

References

External links
 

1826 births
1901 deaths
19th-century classical composers
19th-century male musicians
Burials at Maria Magdalena Church
Male opera composers
Musicians from Stockholm
Romantic composers
Swedish classical composers
Swedish male classical composers
Swedish opera composers
20th-century Swedish male musicians